William Strong (1763January 28, 1840) was an American businessman and politician. He served as a congressman and judge from Vermont.

Biography
Strong was born in Lebanon in the Connecticut Colony in 1763 to Benajah and Polly (Bacon) Strong. He moved with his parents to Hartford the following year. Strong's father was one of the pioneer settlers of Hartford. Strong was self-educated and worked in land surveying and farming. Strong married Abigail Hutchinson on June 17, 1793.

Strong was a member of the Vermont House of Representatives in 1798, 1799, 1801, and 1802, and was the sheriff of Windsor County from 1802 to 1810. He was elected as a Democratic-Republican US Representative to the Twelfth and Thirteenth Congresses, from March 4, 1811 until March 3, 1815.

Strong returned to Vermont politics to sit once more in the state House of Representatives from 1815 to 1818, and as a judge of the Supreme Court of Windsor County from 1819 to 1821. In 1819 he was elected to the Sixteenth Congress, and served from March 4, 1819 to March 3, 1821. In 1832 he served as one of Vermont's Presidential Electors, and voted for Anti-Masonic Party candidate William Wirt.

Death
Strong died in Hartford, Vermont on January 28, 1840, and is interred at Hilltop Cemetery in Quechee, Vermont.

References

External links
 
 The Political Graveyard
 govtrack.us
 States
 Biographical Directory of the United States Congress

1763 births
1840 deaths
People from Lebanon, Connecticut
People from Hartford, Vermont
Members of the Vermont House of Representatives
Vermont state court judges
Anti-Masonic Party politicians from Vermont
Vermont sheriffs
Burials in Vermont
Democratic-Republican Party members of the United States House of Representatives from Vermont